The 2008–09 New Jersey Devils season was the 35th season for the National Hockey League franchise that was established on June 11, 1974, and 27th season since the franchise relocated from Colorado prior to the 1982–83 NHL season.

Pre-season

Regular season

The Devils finished the regular season with the fewest power-play opportunities, with just 307.

 March 17, 2009: In a victory over the Chicago Blackhawks, Martin Brodeur broke Patrick Roy's record for most career wins by a goaltender. Also, Patrik Eliáš became the Devils' all-time leading scorer, previously held by John MacLean, by recording his 702nd career NHL regular-season point.

Divisional standings

Conference standings

Schedule and results

|- align="center" bgcolor=#CCFFCC
| 1 || 10 || New York Islanders || 1-2 || Brodeur || Prudential Center - 16,834 || 1-0-0
|- align="center" bgcolor=#CCFFCC
| 2 || 11 || Pittsburgh Penguins || 2-1 (OT) || Brodeur || Mellon Arena - 17,132 || 2-0-0
|- align="center" bgcolor=#FFBBBB
| 3 || 13 || New York Rangers || 1-4 || Brodeur || Madison Square Garden - 18,200 || 2-1-0
|- align="center" bgcolor=#CCFFCC
| 4 || 16 || Atlanta Thrashers || 1-0 || Brodeur || Philips Arena - 11,293 || 3-1-0 
|- align="center" bgcolor=#CCFFCC
| 5 || 18 || Washington Capitals || 4-3 (SO) || Brodeur || Verizon Center - 17,904 || 4-1-0
|- align="center" bgcolor=#CCFFCC
| 6 || 22 || Dallas Stars || 0-5 || Brodeur || Prudential Center - 12,101 || 5-1-0
|- align="center" bgcolor=#FFBBBB
| 7 || 24 || Philadelphia Flyers || 6-3 || Brodeur || Prudential Center - 15,529 || 5-2-0
|- align="center" bgcolor="lightgrey"
| 8 || 25 || Philadelphia Flyers || 2-3 (OT) || Brodeur || Wachovia Center - 19,611 || 5-2-1
|- align="center" bgcolor="lightgrey" 
| 9 || 29 || Toronto Maple Leafs || 6-5 (SO) || Brodeur || Prudential Center - 14,119 || 5-2-2
|-

|- align="center" bgcolor = #CCFFCC
| 10 || 1 || Atlanta Thrashers || 1-6  || Brodeur || Prudential Center - 14,958 || 6-2-2
|- align="center" bgcolor = #FFBBBB
| 11 || 3 || Buffalo Sabres || 2-0 || Weekes || Prudential Center - 10,567 || 6-3-2
|- align="center" bgcolor = #CCFFCC
| 12 || 5 || Tampa Bay Lightning || 3-4 (SO) || Weekes || Prudential Center - 11,619 || 7-3-2
|- align="center" bgcolor = #FFBBBB
| 13 || 8 || Detroit Red Wings || 1-3 || Weekes || Joe Louis Arena - 20,066 || 7-4-2
|- align="center" bgcolor = #FFBBBB
| 14 || 9 || Edmonton Oilers || 2-1 || Clemmensen || Prudential Center - 14,193 || 7-5-2
|- align="center" bgcolor = #FFBBBB
| 15 || 12 || New York Rangers || 5-2 || Weekes || Prudential Center - 17,625 || 7-6-2
|- align="center" bgcolor = #FFBBBB
| 16 || 14 || Washington Capitals || 1-3 || Clemmensen || Verizon Center - 18,277 || 7-7-2
|- align="center" bgcolor = #CCFFCC
| 17 || 15 || Washington Capitals || 5-6 || Clemmensen || Prudential Center - 17,051 || 8-7-2
|- align="center" bgcolor = #CCFFCC
| 18 || 20 || Florida Panthers || 1-3 || Clemmensen || Prudential Center - 14,291 || 9-7-2
|- align="center" bgcolor = #CCFFCC
| 19 || 21 || New York Islanders || 2-5 || Weekes || Prudential Center - 17,138 || 10-7-2
|- align="center" bgcolor = #CCFFCC
| 20 || 23 || Tampa Bay Lightning || 7-3 || Clemmensen || St. Pete Times Forum - 14,222 || 11-7-2
|- align="center" bgcolor = #CCFFCC
| 21 || 26 || Florida Panthers || 3-2 (SO) || Clemmensen || BankAtlantic Center - 14,932 || 12-7-2
|- align="center" bgcolor = #FFBBBB
| 22 || 29 || Pittsburgh Penguins || 1-4 || Clemmensen || Mellon Arena - 17,132 || 12-8-2
|-

|- align="center" bgcolor = #CCFFCC
| 23 || 4 || Philadelphia Flyers || 3-2 (OT) || Clemmensen || Wachovia Center - 19,577 || 13-8-2
|- align="center" bgcolor = #CCFFCC
| 24 || 6 || Montreal Canadiens || 2-1 (OT) || Clemmensen || Bell Centre - 21,273 || 14-8-2
|- align="center" bgcolor = #CCFFCC
| 25 || 10 || Pittsburgh Penguins || 1-4 || Clemmensen || Prudential Center - 16,808 || 15-8-2
|- align="center" bgcolor = #CCFFCC
| 26 || 12 || New York Rangers || 5-8 || Clemmensen || Prudential Center - 17,625 || 16-8-2
|- align="center" bgcolor = #FFBBBB
| 27 || 13 || Buffalo Sabres || 4-2 || Weekes || Prudential Center - 15,713 || 16-9-2
|- align="center" bgcolor = "lightgrey"
| 28 || 16 || Toronto Maple Leafs || 2-3 (SO) || Clemmensen || Air Canada Centre - 19,315 || 16-9-3
|- align="center" bgcolor = #CCFFCC
| 29 || 17 || Buffalo Sabres || 5-3 || Clemmensen || HSBC Arena - 18,690 || 17-9-3
|- align="center" bgcolor = #CCFFCC
| 30 || 19 || Ottawa Senators || 1-5 || Clemmensen || Prudential Center - 16,400 ||18-9-3
|- align="center" bgcolor = "#CCFFCC"
| 31 || 21 || Philadelphia Flyers || 3-2 || Clemmensen || Prudential Center - 14,426 || 19-9-3
|- align="center" bgcolor = "#FFBBBB"
| 32 || 23 || Boston Bruins || 2-0 || Clemmensen || Prudential Center - 16,305 || 19-10-3
|- align="center" bgcolor = "#FFBBBB"
| 33 || 26 || Pittsburgh Penguins || 1-0 || Clemmensen || Prudential Center - 15,204 || 19-11-3
|- align="center" bgcolor = "#CCFFCC"
| 34 || 27 || New York Rangers || 4-2 || Clemmensen || Madison Square Garden - 18,200 || 20-11-3
|- align="center" bgcolor = "#CCFFCC"
| 35 || 30 || St. Louis Blues || 4-3 || Clemmensen || Scottrade Center - 19,150 || 21-11-3
|- align="center" bgcolor = "#FFBBBB"
| 36 || 31 || Dallas Stars || 2-4 || Clemmensen || American Airlines Center - 18,584 || 21-12-3
|-

|- align="center" bgcolor = #CCFFCC
| 37 || 2 || Montreal Canadiens || 4-1 || Clemmensen || Prudential Center - 17,625 || 22-12-3
|- align="center" bgcolor = #CCFFCC
| 38 || 4 || Ottawa Senators || 4-3 (OT) || Clemmensen || Prudential Center - 14,798 || 23-12-3
|- align="center" bgcolor = #FFBBBB
| 39 || 6 || Carolina Hurricanes || 2-3 || Clemmensen || RBC Center - 15,399 || 23-13-3
|- align="center" bgcolor = #FFBBBB
| 40 || 8 || Atlanta Thrashers || 4-0 || Clemmensen || Prudential Center - 16,489 || 23-14-3
|- align="center" bgcolor = #CCFFCC
| 41 || 10 || Los Angeles Kings || 5-1 || Weekes || Staples Center - 18,118 || 24-14-3
|- align="center" bgcolor = #FFBBBB
| 42 || 11 || Anaheim Ducks || 3-4 || Clemmensen || Honda Center - 17,331 || 24-15-3
|- align="center" bgcolor = #CCFFCC
| 43 || 13 || Vancouver Canucks || 5-3 || Clemmensen || GM Place - 18,630 || 25-15-3 
|- align="center" bgcolor = #CCFFCC
| 44 || 16 || Columbus Blue Jackets || 2-1 || Weekes || Nationwide Arena - 17,738 || 26-15-3
|- align="center" bgcolor = #CCFFCC
| 45 || 17 || New York Islanders || 3-1 || Clemmensen || Nassau Coliseum - 16,234 || 27-15-3
|- align="center" bgcolor = #CCFFCC
| 46 || 19 || Nashville Predators || 3-1 || Clemmensen || Sommet Center - 14,848 || 28-15-3
|- align="center" bgcolor = #CCFFCC
| 47 || 21 || Montreal Canadiens || 2-5 || Clemmensen || Prudential Center - 16,235 ||29-15-3
|- align="center" bgcolor = #CCFFCC
| 48 || 27 || Ottawa Senators || 4-1 || Clemmensen || Scotiabank Place - 18,786 ||30-15-3
|- align="center" bgcolor = #CCFFCC
| 49 || 29 || Boston Bruins || 4-3 (OT) || Clemmensen || TD Banknorth Garden - 17,565 ||31-15-3
|- align="center" bgcolor = #CCFFCC
| 50 || 30 || Pittsburgh Penguins || 3-4 (OT) || Clemmensen || Prudential Center - 17,625 ||32-15-3
|-

|- align="center" bgcolor = #FFBBBB
| 51 || 3 || Washington Capitals || 5-2 || Clemmensen || Prudential Center - 14,018 ||32-16-3
|- align="center" bgcolor = #CCFFCC
| 52 || 6 || Atlanta Thrashers || 5-1 || Weekes || Philips Arena - 17,067 ||33-16-3
|- align="center" bgcolor = #FFBBBB
| 53 || 7 || Los Angeles Kings || 3-1 || Clemmensen || Prudential Center - 17,056 ||33-17-3
|- align="center" bgcolor = #CCFFCC
| 54 || 9 || New York Rangers || 0-3 || Clemmensen || Prudential Center - 17,625 ||34-17-3
|- align="center" bgcolor = #CCFFCC
| 55 || 11 || New York Islanders || 2-4 || Weekes || Prudential Center - 14,251 ||35-17-3
|- align="center" bgcolor = #CCFFCC
| 56 || 13 || Boston Bruins || 0-1 || Clemmensen || Prudential Center - 15,257 ||36-17-3
|- align="center" bgcolor = #CCFFCC
| 57 || 15 || San Jose Sharks || 5-6 || Clemmensen || Prudential Center - 17,625 ||37-17-3
|- align="center" bgcolor = #FFBBBB
| 58 || 17 || Florida Panthers || 0-4 || Clemmensen || BankAtlantic Center - 14,514 || 37-18-3
|- align="center" bgcolor = #CCFFCC
| 59 || 19 || Tampa Bay Lightning || 3-2 (SO) || Weekes || St. Pete Times Forum - 14,408 ||38-18-3
|- align="center" bgcolor = #FFBBBB
| 60 || 21 || New York Islanders || 0-4 || Clemmensen || Nassau Coliseum - 15,511 ||38-19-3
|- align="center" bgcolor = #CCFFCC
| 61 || 26 || Colorado Avalanche || 0-4 || Brodeur || Prudential Center - 16,107 ||39-19-3
|- align="center" bgcolor = #CCFFCC
| 62 || 28 || Florida Panthers || 2-7 || Brodeur || Prudential Center - 16,256 ||40-19-3
|-

|- align="center" bgcolor = #CCFFCC
| 63 || 1 || Philadelphia Flyers || 0-3 || Brodeur || Prudential Center - 17,625 ||41-19-3
|- align="center" bgcolor = #CCFFCC
| 64 || 3 || Toronto Maple Leafs || 3-2 (OT) || Brodeur || Air Canada Centre - 19,389 ||42-19-3
|- align="center" bgcolor = #FFBBBB
| 65 || 7 || New York Islanders || 3-7 || Brodeur || Nassau Coliseum - 15,524 ||42-20-3
|- align="center" bgcolor = #CCFFCC
| 66 || 10 || Calgary Flames || 2-3 || Brodeur || Prudential Center - 14,598 ||43-20-3
|- align="center" bgcolor = #CCFFCC
| 67 || 12 || Phoenix Coyotes || 2-5 || Brodeur || Prudential Center - 14,578 ||44-20-3
|- align="center" bgcolor = #CCFFCC
| 68 || 14 || Montreal Canadiens || 3-1 || Brodeur || Bell Centre - 21,273 ||45-20-3
|- align="center" bgcolor = #CCFFCC
| 69 || 17 || Chicago Blackhawks || 2-3 || Brodeur || Prudential Center - 17,625 ||46-20-3
|- align="center" bgcolor = #FFBBBB
| 70 || 18 || Carolina Hurricanes || 2-4 || Weekes || RBC Center - 18,544 ||46-21-3
|- align="center" bgcolor = #CCFFCC
| 71 || 20 || Minnesota Wild || 0-4 || Brodeur || Prudential Center - 17,625 ||47-21-3
|- align="center" bgcolor = #FFBBBB
| 72 || 22 || Boston Bruins || 1-4 || Brodeur || TD Banknorth Garden - 17,565 ||47-22-3
|- align="center" bgcolor = #FFBBBB
| 73 || 23 || Philadelphia Flyers || 2-4 || Brodeur || Wachovia Center - 19,762 ||47-23-3
|- align="center" bgcolor = "lightgrey"
| 74 || 27 || Chicago Blackhawks || 2-3 (OT) || Brodeur || United Center - 21,617 ||47-23-4
|- align="center" bgcolor = #FFBBBB
| 75 || 28 || Carolina Hurricanes || 2-1 || Brodeur || Prudential Center - 17,018 ||47-24-4
|- align="center" bgcolor = #FFBBBB
| 76 || 30 || New York Rangers || 0-3 || Brodeur || Madison Square Garden - 18,200 ||47-25-4
|-

|- align="center" bgcolor = #FFBBBB
| 77 || 1 || Pittsburgh Penguins || 1-6 || Brodeur || Mellon Arena - 17,132 ||47-26-4
|- align="center" bgcolor = #CCFFCC
| 78 || 3 || Tampa Bay Lightning || 4-5 (OT) || Brodeur || Prudential Center - 17,625 ||48-26-4
|- align="center" bgcolor = #CCFFCC
| 79 || 4 || Buffalo Sabres || 3-2 || Brodeur || HSBC Arena - 18,690 ||49-26-4
|- align="center" bgcolor = #FFBBBB
| 80 || 7 || Toronto Maple Leafs || 4-1 || Brodeur || Prudential Center - 15,046 ||49-27-4
|- align="center" bgcolor = #CCFFCC
| 81 || 9 || Ottawa Senators || 3-2 (SO) || Brodeur || Scotiabank Place - 20,151 ||50-27-4
|- align="center" bgcolor = #CCFFCC
| 82 || 11 || Carolina Hurricanes || 2-3 || Brodeur ||  Prudential Center - 17,625 ||51-27-4
|-

|-
| Schedule

Playoffs

The New Jersey Devils ended the 2008–09 regular season as the Atlantic Division Champions and the Eastern Conference's third seed. The Devils have made the playoffs for the 12th straight season.

 Win  Loss  Win Playoff Series  Eliminated from playoffs

Media
Television coverage was now on MSG Plus, still under the play-by-play of Mike Emrick and Chico Resch. Radio coverage was still on WFAN with Matt Loughlin and Sherry Ross.

Player statistics

Skaters

Goaltenders
Note: GP = Games played; Min = Minutes; W = Wins; L = Losses; OT = Overtime losses; GA = Goals against; GAA= Goals against average; SA= Shots against; SV= Saves; Sv% = Save percentage; SO= Shutouts

†Denotes player spent time with another team before joining Devils. Stats reflect time with Devils only.
‡Traded mid-season. Stats reflect time with Devils only.

Awards and records

Awards

Nominations

Records

Milestones

Transactions

Trades

Free agents

Draft picks
New Jersey's picks at the 2008 NHL Entry Draft in Ottawa, Ontario.

See also
2008–09 NHL season

Farm teams
The Lowell Devils of the American Hockey League and the Trenton Devils of the ECHL remain the New Jersey Devils' minor league affiliates for the 2008–09 season.

References

New Jersey Devils seasons
New Jersey Devils
New Jersey Devils
New Jersey Devils
New Jersey Devils
21st century in Newark, New Jersey